Losing Sleep is the seventh studio album by American country music artist Chris Young. It was released on October 20, 2017 via RCA Records Nashville.

Content
Young told Rolling Stone that the album's title track and lead single "is the most pop-leaning song I've ever done... But there's a lot of stuff on this record that's really traditional-leaning, too. My voice is unabashedly country, but I do think this is a very in-the-moment record." Young co-wrote every song on the album, collaborating with producer Corey Crowder on several.

Critical reception
Rating it 4 out of 5 stars, Stephen Thomas Erlewine of AllMusic wrote that "Every element of Losing Sleep unfolds so easily, it feels inevitable, and it's so polished it can seem like nothing but mood music, but repeated plays reveal that this is more than atmosphere".

Commercial performance
The album debuted at No. 5 on the Billboard 200 and No. 1 on the Top Country Albums chart, selling 32,000 copies (39,000 units including track sales and streams). It sold a further 7,200 copies in the second week. It has sold 117,000 copies in the United States as of April 2019.

Track listing

Personnel
Adapted from AllMusic

Cary Barlowe - background vocals
Jake Clayton - cello, viola, violin
Dave Cohen - Hammond B-3 organ, piano, synthesizer, Wurlitzer
Terry Crisp - steel guitar
Corey Crowder - programming
Tony Lucido - bass guitar
Miles McPherson - drums
Carl Miner - acoustic guitar, hi-string guitar, mandolin
Russell Terrell - background vocals
Derek Wells - acoustic guitar, electric guitar
Chris Young - lead vocals

Charts

Weekly charts

Year-end charts

Certifications

References

2017 albums
Chris Young (musician) albums
RCA Records albums